Karaisalı is a small town and a district in Adana Province of Turkey, administratively a part of the Metropolitan Municipality of Adana.

The area contains the reservoirs of Çatalan and Nergizlik. There is a wrestling tournament in late-April to early-May at Salbaş and a countryside festival in the last week of August at Kızıldağ.

History
In Greek and Roman times there was a town here named Midelle. Throughout history, the town was controlled by several kingdoms, such as Seljuk Empire and Armenian Kingdom of Cilicia. Following the arrival of the Turkish population in the area the name was changed to Çeceli and inhabited by the Yüreğir and Menemencioğulları and  Ramazanoğulları tribes. 

Between 1481 and 1496 the town was controlled by the Mameluks and once it was defeated by the Ottoman sultan Selim I, he left the control of the town to the Ramazanoğulları dynasty as a vassal state. The current name Karaisalı was later given in memory of a Ramazanoğulları lord.

The town was not occupied during the Turkish War of Independence in the early 1920s and became a centre of Turkish resistance for the Çukurova area.

Karaisalı today
Long-term mayor of Adana, Aytaç Durak is from Karaisalı and during his term the district was included in the Metropolitan Municipality of Adana.

Places of interest
The Roman built Milvan Castle in the village of Karakılıç.
The silk road caravanserai Kesiri Han in the village of Altınova.
Another Roman castle Keçi Kalesi 40 km north-east of Karaisalı in the village of Etekli. has commanding views from its hill-top position.
The wooded hillside picnic areas of Yerköprü and Kızıldağ in particular Kapıkaya Canyon.
The attractive remote village of Kalayçılar. 7 km from the village of Hacılı on a dirt road.
The Fish restaurant in Demirçit or otherwise known as Bolagat.

References

 
Cities in Turkey
Districts of Adana Province
Populated places in Adana Province